The 1872 Tamworth by-election was fought on 16 April 1872[20 3].  The byelection was fought due to the death of the incumbent Liberal MP, John Peel.  It was won by the Conservative candidate Robert William Hanbury.

References

1872 in England
Politics of Tamworth, Staffordshire
1872 elections in the United Kingdom
By-elections to the Parliament of the United Kingdom in Staffordshire constituencies
19th century in Staffordshire